The Panjab Football Team is a representative football team formed in 2014 in the United Kingdom to represent the Punjabi diaspora. The team is governed by the Football Association of Panjab, this is not to be confused with the Punjab Football Association, which is the state governing body of football in the Punjab state of India.

Background

The Panjab FA was founded in 2014 with the primary aim of establishing a team to represent the community of the Punjab across the world. The Punjab region is an area that stretches across parts of eastern Pakistan and northern India, and the association has aligned itself within the boundaries of this area, as represented by the Sikh Empire under Maharaja Ranjit Singh in the 19th century. To this end, the association applied for membership of the Confederation of Independent Football Associations (ConIFA), an international body designed to allow nations, unrecognised states, minorities, stateless peoples and others ineligible to join FIFA to take part in competitive international football. The Panjab FA joined ConIFA on 7 April 2014.

Following the establishment of the association and the confirmation of its membership of ConIFA, a series of trials was held in order to select the initial squad selection. The first of these took place in December 2014, with subsequent trials into 2015. On 22 December 2014, the first match organised by the Panjab FA saw a team of trialists take on the Sealand national "B" team, in which the Panjab XI won 4–1.

In early 2015, the association continued the development of its structures, with the recruitment of coaches and scouts, and the first full training session of the initial national squad. In May 2015, it was announced that the team would participate in its first full international fixtures when it was invited to take part in the Niamh Challenge Cup in the Isle of Man, a four team tournament that would not only provide the first international opposition for the team, but also provide a route to qualify for the 2016 ConIFA World Football Cup. The team was also due to participate in a second friendly tournament, the Benedikt Fontana Cup, held in Raetia, and which would provide a second opportunity to qualify for the WFC. However, they subsequently pulled out of this tournament, to be replaced by the Chagos Islands, the team will compete at the 2016 ConIFA World Football Cup.

2016 ConIFA World Football Cup 
Panjab was selected as one of the twelve participants in the 2016 ConIFA World Football Cup in January 2016. At the subsequent draw, the team was placed in Group D alongside Sápmi and Somaliland. The team finished top of the group, before playing Western Armenia in the quarter-final, and Padania in the semi-final. Victory saw them face the hosts, Abkhazia in the final, where they led until the 88th minute before losing on penalties.

2018 ConIFA World Football Cup 
The team also competed at the 2018 ConIFA World Football Cup, managed by Reuben Hazell.

Matches

2014

2015

2016

2017

2018

2019

Current squad
The following players were called up for the 2018 ConIFA World Football Cup. Caps and goals correct as of 21 May after the game against .

Head Coach:  Manraj Singh Sucha

Managers

References

External links
 Panjab FA

CONIFA member associations
Asian national and official selection-teams not affiliated to FIFA
Punjabi culture